Eternal Flame is a monument that established for the Azerbaijanis died during Black January. The monument is situated in Martyrs’ Line, Baku. Every year Azerbaijanis commemorate Black January in that place.

History 
The initial idea for the establishment of the monument for martyrs created in 1994. Heydar Aliyev was the initiator of the project and created the special commission for this issue. Two projects presented to the president in the annual commemoration. One of the projects was presented by the sculptor Omer Eldarov. During that years the economic conditions were severe in the country and the main requirement for the monument was low cost. These two projected did not meet that requirement and delayed. During the next years, new projects were offered and among the contestants selected project was created by the company led by sculptor Elbay Gasimzadeh.

The monument was built in accordance with the presidential decree dated on August 5, 1998. The value of the monument is two billion manats. The opening ceremony was held on the 9th of October in 1998.

In 2007 the monument of Eternal Flame restored. According to the restoration columns of the monument became higher and golden parts were added to the eight-pointed stars.

Description of the monument 
Eternal Flame is standing on the eight-pointed star and over the flame, there is a golden tomb with a glass dome.

Gallery

See also 
 Baku Turkish Martyrs' Memorial

References 

Monuments and memorials in Azerbaijan
Eternal flames
1998 establishments in Azerbaijan